The 1970 IFA Shield Final was the 74th final of the IFA Shield, the second oldest football competition in India, and was contested between Kolkata giant East Bengal and Iranian giant PAS Tehran on 25 September 1970 at the Eden Gardens in Kolkata.

East Bengal won the final 1–0 to claim their 10th IFA Shield title. Parimal Dey scored in the last minute of the game.

Route to the final

East Bengal

East Bengal entered the 1970 IFA Shield as one of the leading Kolkata giants and was supposed to start their campaign from the third round. They were supposed to face George Telegraph but they were handed a walkover and East Bengal progressed into the next round. In the quarter-finals, East Bengal defeated Eastern Railway 5–0 with Shyam Thapa scoring a brace and Samaresh Chowdhury, Syed Nayeemuddin and Mohammed Habib scoring for the team. East Bengal faced Mohammedan Sporting in the semi-finals and were leading 1–0 courtesy of a goal from Mohammed Habib, but Mohammedan Sporting walked out of the game and conceded the match. The IFA announced East Bengal as the winners of the semi-final as they reached the final.

PAS Tehran

PAS Tehran, the runners up of the 1969 Tehran Province League, the top tier of Iranian football, were invited by the IFA to participate in the 1970 IFA Shield tournament. They started their campaign in the third round, where they defeated Aryan 1–0 with Iran national team forward Asghar Sharafi scoring the only goal for the team. In the quarter-finals, PAS Tehran defeated BNR 5–0 with goals from Homayoun Shahrokhi, who scored twice while Jahangir Nassiri, Parviz Mirza-Hassan and Asghar Sharafi scored one each. In the semi-final, PAS Tehran defeated Kolkata giants Mohun Bagan 2–0 with both the goals in the second half scored by Daud Ahmadzadeh and Asghar Sharifi as they reached the final.

Match

Details

Notes

See also
IFA Shield Finals

References

IFA Shield finals
1970–71 in Indian football
East Bengal Club matches
PAS Tehran F.C.
Football competitions in Kolkata